The CB450DX or CB450N is a motorcycle produced by Moto Honda da Amazonia Ltda from 1989 to 1992.

With its 450cc engine derived from the original Superdream CB400N, it proved to be a big seller in Brazil and South America where the earlier Superdreams sold well, too, due to their low running costs and good reliability.
Honda decided to build upon this legacy with the 450DX;  however, it did not sell in great numbers in the rest of the world due to poor build quality and a few inherited design problems from the Superdream.

Honda replaced it with the all new Honda CB500 twin in 1994.

The  parallel twin motor produces a claimed , and was derived from the Superdream. It has a 6-speed manual gear box, and is chain driven.

It was quite advanced in some ways, using hydraulic disc brakes both at the front and back as well as a 6-valve head. In other ways, however, it was harking back to the late 1970s with its retro styling, semi automatic camchain tensioner and balancer system.

The bike is a popular beginner bike, due to its low cost used, and easy maneuverability.

CB450
Motorcycles introduced in 1989
Standard motorcycles
Motorcycles powered by straight-twin engines